Chart Pattana Party may refer to:

 National Development Party (Thailand)
 Chart Pattana Party (2007)